Connie Powney (born 22 May 1983 in Eastbourne) is an English actress.

Personal life 
Powney has a twin sister, Cassie, who is her younger twin by two minutes.

Career 
She played the role of Sophie Burton in the soap opera Hollyoaks, alongside Cassie (who played Mel Burton).

She has been interested in acting since childhood and did a lot of twin roles with Cassie, including a twin role in the 2003 film What a Girl Wants which also starred the teen Hollywood star Amanda Bynes.

She was nominated for the Best Actress Award at the 2006 British Soap Awards but lost out to Lacey Turner.

Filmography

External links 
 

British identical twins
English child actresses
English twins
Identical twin actresses
People from Seaford, East Sussex
1983 births
Living people
English soap opera actresses
English television actresses